ForSea Ferries is a ferry company serving the route between Helsingborg, Sweden and Helsingør, Denmark. Until 2018 the company was called HH-Ferries Group, and the trading name Scandlines was used. The Helsingør–Helsingborg ferry route crosses the narrowest part of the Øresund, taking about 20 minutes to traverse the 4 km strait. The company owns five vessels, including the sister ships Tycho Brahe, Aurora af Helsingborg and Hamlet each of which has a capacity of 240 cars and 1250 passengers.

In 2018 the ferries Tycho Brahe and Aurora af Helsingborg were converted to battery power. They are completely emission-free when in battery mode, reducing their total CO2 emissions by as much as 65%.

In 2020 ForSea Ferries experienced a reduction of 80% in passenger numbers due to the COVID-19 pandemic. The number of departures was reduced and seventy staff were made redundant.

In January 2023, the Danish and Swedish competition regulators approved the sale of ForSea to the Danish ferry operator Molslinjen.

History
ForSea Ferries was originally established in 1996 under the name "Sundbroen" ("The Sound Bridge") by the Danish shipowner Per Henriksen. It was sold in 1997 and changed name to HH-Ferries. In 2001 the company was sold again, this time to the Swedish business group Stena, operating under the Scandlines brand. ForSea Ferries has around 230 employees, both Danish and Swedish. After further cooperational deals, the company was suddenly owned by the same cooperation as former competitors Scandlines. In 2011 the competition on the HH Ferry route finished with the larger eating the smaller, with the two Mercandias, IV and VIII being added to the Scandlines-HH Ferries fleet. In 2018 HH-Ferries rebranded as ForSea Ferries as Aurora and Tycho Brahe were reintroduced into service as battery-electric vessels. Around the same time as the rebranding took place, ForSea decided to ditch the Scandlines branding in favour of creating a new, independent brand image which sought to distinguish ForSea as a cleaner and greener service compared to Scandlines.

Fleet

As of 2021, ForSea Ferries owns 5 vessels:

References
 Det Maritime Danmark - HH-Ferries A/S (translation)
 "About us", hhferries.dk

Mercandia IV
 faergelejet.dk
 ferry-site.dk
 skip-siden.com
faergejournalen.dk (with somewhat detailed history)

Mercandia VIII
 faergelejet.dk
 ferry-site.dk
 skip-siden.com

Aurora af Helsingborg

Tycho Brahe

Hamlet

References

External links
 Official website

Ferry companies of Sweden
Ferry companies of Denmark